Adrián Alejandro Maidana (born 30 November 1988) is an Argentine professional footballer who plays as a midfielder for Talleres, on loan from Brown.

Career
Maidana began his career with Primera B Nacional's Belgrano. He made his professional debut on 20 June 2009 during a 2–1 defeat to All Boys, which was one of three appearances in 2008–09 which ended with Belgrano losing in the promotion play-offs to Rosario Central. They were promoted two seasons later, with Maidana having featured twenty-four times. Ahead of 2011–12, Maidana was loaned to Sarmiento of Primera B Metropolitana. He scored his first senior goal in August 2011 against Temperley. He returned to Belgrano two years later, which preceded an immediate loan move to Brown on 18 July 2013.

After two goals in thirty games on loan with Brown, with Maidana back with his parent club, he was loaned out for a third time to Primera B Nacional side Nueva Chicago. Seven months later, in February 2015, Maidana departed Belgrano permanently to rejoin Brown; now in the third tier. He netted goals in matches with Tristán Suárez and Comunicaciones as the club won promotion to the 2016 Primera B Nacional. July 2019 saw Maidana loaned to Primera B Metropolitana's Talleres.

Career statistics
.

Honours
Sarmiento
Primera B Metropolitana: 2011–12

Brown
Primera B Metropolitana: 2015

References

External links

1988 births
Living people
Sportspeople from Córdoba Province, Argentina
Argentine footballers
Association football midfielders
Primera Nacional players
Primera B Metropolitana players
Club Atlético Belgrano footballers
Club Atlético Sarmiento footballers
Club Atlético Brown footballers
Nueva Chicago footballers
Talleres de Remedios de Escalada footballers